The women's 1500 meter at the 2019 KNSB Dutch Single Distance Championships took place in Heerenveen at the Thialf ice skating rink on Friday 28 December 2018. Although this tournament was held in 2018, it was part of the 2018–2019 speed skating season.

There were 20 participants.

Title holder was Jorien ter Mors.

Result

Source:

References

Single Distance Championships
2019 Single Distance
World